Benjamin Burge (born 11 June 1980 in Albury, New South Wales) is an Australian sport shooter. Since 2001, Burge had won a total of seven medals (five silver and two bronze) in both air and small-bore rifle at the Oceania Shooting Championships. He also captured a bronze medal for the men's 50 m rifle three positions at the 2006 Commonwealth Games in Melbourne, accumulating a score of 1,238.2 points.

Burge represented Australia at the 2008 Summer Olympics in Beijing, where he competed for all three rifle shooting events. In his first event, 10 m air rifle, Burge was able to hit a total of 576 points within six attempts, finishing forty-ninth in the qualifying rounds. Few days later, he placed fortieth in the 50 m rifle prone, by two points ahead of Austria's Christian Planer, with a total score of 588 points. In his third and last event, 50 m rifle 3 positions, Burge was able to shoot 392 targets in a prone position, 373 in standing, and 387 in kneeling, for a total score of 1,152 points, finishing again in fortieth place.

References

External links
Profile – Australian Olympic Team
NBC Olympics Profile

Australian male sport shooters
Living people
Olympic shooters of Australia
Shooters at the 2008 Summer Olympics
Shooters at the 2006 Commonwealth Games
Commonwealth Games silver medallists for Australia
Commonwealth Games bronze medallists for Australia
Sportspeople from Albury
1980 births
Commonwealth Games medallists in shooting
Sportsmen from New South Wales
20th-century Australian people
21st-century Australian people
Medallists at the 2006 Commonwealth Games